Sylvester Marshall Smith (March 28, 1806 – February 22, 1880) was an early leader in the Latter Day Saint movement and one of the inaugural seven Presidents of the Seventy.

Biography
Smith was born in Tyringham, Massachusetts. He was a farmer, teacher, and carpenter by trade. He was baptized into the Church of Christ some time before May 1831. Oliver Cowdery ordained him a high priest on October 25, 1831.  During 1832, he served as a traveling missionary on a journey from Ohio to Vermont.

Zion's Camp
Smith was a member of Zion's Camp in 1834, where in the words of Heber C. Kimball he displayed "refractory feelings." During Zion's Camp he was blamed for "confrontations with Joseph Smith (to whom he was no relation), insubordination, threatening Joseph's dog, arguing with him, and refusing to share bread." Upon the return of Zion's Camp to Kirtland, Ohio, Smith's complaints against Joseph Smith resulted in the only time in church history that the Common Council of the Church has been convened to try a President of the Church. The August 1834 Council, which was presided over by Bishop Newel K. Whitney, determined that Joseph Smith had "acted in every respect in an honorable and proper manner with all monies and properties entrusted to his charge." In September 1834, Sylvester Smith reconciled with the high council and was dropped from the council without protesting.

Kirtland life
On February 14, 1835, Smith attended the meeting where the inaugural Quorum of the Twelve was called, and three days later he was appointed to the Kirtland High Council.  Later that month he was ordained a Seventy, and named as one of the inaugural presidents of the Seventies the next day. He continued to serve on the Kirtland High Council, from which he was released in early 1836.

Smith remained very active in the Latter Day Saint community for the next two years. In 1836, he briefly acted as scribe for Joseph Smith. In Kirtland he attended the Hebrew School, the School of the Prophets, the solemn assembly in January 1836, and the dedication of the Kirtland Temple. He was a member of the Kirtland Safety Society when it was formed in 1837. Perhaps because of disputed preeminence between High Priests and Seventies, five of the seven presidents of the Seventy previously ordained as High Priests, including Smith, were released and returned to the High Priests quorum in April 1837.  George A. Smith later reported that by 1837 Sylvester was numbered among the dissenters from Joseph Smith and the church. By 1838, Smith had left the church. At this time, many Latter Day Saints had left Kirtland, leaving Smith behind in the city until 1853, when he sold his land and moved to Council Bluffs, Iowa. There he was a lawyer and bought and sold real estate. In the 1850s and 1860s, he was the county school fund commissioner and justice of the peace. Smith died in Council Bluffs at the age of 73.

Footnotes

Sources

.
.  Entry for Sylvester Smith online at 
.
.
.  Entry for Sylvester Smith online at 
.  Entry for Sylvester Smith online at 
.
.
.
.
.

External links

1806 births
1880 deaths
19th-century Mormon missionaries
American Latter Day Saint missionaries
American justices of the peace
Businesspeople from Iowa
Converts to Mormonism
Doctrine and Covenants people
Former Latter Day Saints
Iowa lawyers
Latter Day Saint missionaries in the United States
Leaders in the Church of Christ (Latter Day Saints)
People from Council Bluffs, Iowa
People from Tyringham, Massachusetts
Presidents of the Seventy (LDS Church)
Religious leaders from Massachusetts
School board members in Iowa